The Temple of Athena Alea was a sanctuary at Tegea in Ancient Greece, dedicated to Athena under the epithet Athena Alea. It was a significant temple, regarded to be one of the most important shrines of Athena in Ancient Greece.

History

The temple was said to have been built by Aleus, the son of Apheidas, from whom the goddess probably derived this epithet.

The first temple burned down in 394 BC, and a second temple was built by the architect Scopas.

The temple of Athena Alea at Tegea was an ancient and revered asylum, and the names of many persons are recorded who saved themselves by seeking refuge in it.
Among the famous people seeking asylum at the temple, Pausanis recounts Chryseis, the Spartan Leotychides, and the Spartan general Pausanias: 
[The historical Spartan general Pausanias] did not wait to stand his trial, but was received by the people of Tegea as a suppliant of Athena Alea. Now this sanctuary had been respected from early days by all the Peloponnesians, and afforded peculiar safety to its suppliants, as the Lacedaemonians showed in the case of Pausanias and of Leotychides before him, and the Argives in the case of Chryseis; they never wanted even to ask for these refugees, who were sitting as suppliants in the sanctuary, to be given up.

Structure

The second sanctuary was a temple of the Doric order which in size and splendor was said to surpass all other temples in the Peloponnese, and was surrounded by a triple row of columns of different orders. Pausanias described the exterior:
The modern temple is far superior to all other temples in the Peloponnese on many grounds, especially for its size. Its first row of pillars is Doric, and the next to it Corinthian; also, outside the temple, stand pillars of the Ionic order. [...] On the front gable is the hunting of the Calydonian boar . . . On the gable at the back is a representation of Telephos fighting Achilles on the plain of the Caycus.
  
The statue of the goddess was made by Endoeus all of ivory. It was described as "... made throughout of ivory, the work of Endoeus. Those in charge of the curiosities say that one of the boar's tusks has broken off; the remaining one is kept in the gardens of the emperor, in a sanctuary of Dionysos, and is about half a fathom long."  The cult statue was subsequently carried to Rome by Augustus to adorn the Forum of Augustus.

The interior of the temple was described by Pausanias: 
The present image at Tegea was brought from the parish of Manthurenses, and among them it had the surname of Hippia (Horse Goddess). According to their account, when the battle of the gods and giants took place the goddess drove the chariot and horses against Enkelados. Yet this goddess too has come to receive the name of Alea among the Greeks generally and the Peloponnesians themselves. On one side of the image of Athena stands Asklepios, on the other Hygeia (Health), works of Skopas of Paros in Pentelic marble. Of the votive offerings in the temple these are the most notable. There is the hide of the Kalydonian boar, rotted by age and by now altogether without bristles. Hanging up are the fetters, except such as have been destroyed by rust, worn by the [historic] Lacedaemonian prisoners when they dug the plain of Tegea. There have been dedicated a sacred couch of Athena, a portrait painting of [the mythical princess] Auge, and the shield of Marpessa, surnamed Khoira, a woman of Tegea . . . [...] The altar for the goddess was made, they say, by [the mythical hero] Melampos, the son of Amythaon. Represented on the altar are Rhea and the nymph Oinoe holding the baby Zeus. On either side are four figures: on one, Glauke, Neda, Theisoa and Anthrakia; on the other Ide, Hagno, Alkinoe and Phrixa. There are also images of the Muses and of Mnemosyne (Memory).

Cult

Two festivals were celebrated at the sanctuary: 
Not far from the temple is a stadium formed by a mound of earth, where they celebrate games, one festival called Aleaia after Athena, the other Halotia (Capture Festival) because they captured the greater part of the Lacedaemonians alive in the [historical] battle.

The priest of the temple of Athena Alea at Tegea was a boy, who held office only until reaching the age of puberty.

Excavations
The Archaeological Museum of Tegea narrates the history of the temple and displays collections from the excavations.

References

Temples of Athena
Temples in ancient Arcadia
4th-century BC religious buildings and structures
Tegea